is a former Japanese professional baseball pitcher who played his entire career with the Chunichi Dragons. He is most noted for his combined perfect game with Hitoki Iwase in the 2007 Japan Series to clinch the title for the Dragons for the first time since 1954.

Career
In the 2007 Nippon Series, he threw eight innings of a combined perfect game with Hitoki Iwase to decide the series against the Hokkaido Nippon-Ham Fighters.

On 29 June 2013, Yamai threw the 88th no-hitter in NPB history against the Yokohama DeNA BayStars in a 9-0 win.

External links

NPB.jp

References

1978 births
Living people
People from Toyonaka, Osaka
Japanese expatriate baseball players in the Dominican Republic
Nippon Professional Baseball pitchers
Chunichi Dragons players
Nippon Professional Baseball pitchers who have pitched a perfect game
Estrellas Orientales players